Mariya Matveyevna Stepanova (Russian: Мария Матвеевна Степанова) (1811 or 1816 – 1903) was a Russian opera singer who created the leading soprano roles in A Life for the Tsar, Ruslan and Lyudmila, and Dmitry Donskoy.

Stepanova was born into a family of musicians active in the Imperial Theatres in Saint Petersburg. She initially studied to be ballet dancer and was then trained in singing by Catterino Cavos. She made her operatic debut in 1835 and the following year created the role of Antonida in Glinka's A Life for the Tsar. She sang with the Imperial Opera at the Imperial Bolshoi Kamenny Theatre in Saint Petersburg until 1846 and then at the Bolshoi Theatre in Moscow until 1855 when she retired from the stage. During that time, she periodically returned to perform in Saint Petersburg where she created the role of Ksenia in Anton Rubinstein's Dmitry Donskoy in 1852.

Stepanova died in Saint Petersburg in 1903 and is buried in the city's Novodevichy Cemetery.

References

1903 deaths
1810s births
19th-century women opera singers from the Russian Empire
Russian operatic sopranos
Singers from Saint Petersburg
Sopranos from the Russian Empire
Burials at Novodevichy Cemetery (Saint Petersburg)
Year of birth uncertain